Melissa Fowler (born March 21, 1992) is an American rugby sevens player. She won a silver medal at the 2015 Pan American Games as a member of the United States women's national rugby sevens team.

References

External links
 
 

1992 births
Living people
United States international rugby sevens players
Female rugby sevens players
Rugby sevens players at the 2015 Pan American Games
Pan American Games silver medalists for the United States
Pan American Games medalists in rugby sevens
Medalists at the 2015 Pan American Games